Ernest Aboubacar  (born 13 December 1992) is a Burkina Faso footballer. He was part of the pre-squad of the African Cup 2017. He transferred to AS FAR in January 2017 on a loan deal.

External links
 
 
 
 

1992 births
Living people
Burkinabé footballers
Burkina Faso international footballers
Association football fullbacks
Ittihad Khemisset players
21st-century Burkinabé people